Forever Changed was a Christian rock band from Tallahassee and Orlando, Florida.  They came together in 1999 and broke up in 2006.  Dan Cole was the lead singer, a guitarist, and a pianist.  Ben O'Rear was the lead guitarist, Tom Gustafson played bass, and Nathan Lee played the drums. They released three albums: Drifting into Amazing in 2002, The Need to Feel Alive in 2005 and Chapters in 2006.

Discography

Albums

Demos and EPs

References

Christian rock groups from Florida
Musical groups established in 1999
1999 establishments in Florida